The Houston Mayoral Election of 2001 took place on November 6, 2001.  Incumbent Mayor Lee Brown was re-elected to a third term.  Officially the race was non-partisan.  None of the candidates received a majority of the votes, so a run-off election was held on December 1, 2001.

Candidates 

Incumbent Mayor Lee Brown
City Councilman Orlando Sanchez
City Councilman Chris Bell
Luis Ullrich
Larry DeVoy
Anthony Dutrow

Results

See also 
 Elections in Texas

Mayoral election, 2001
Houston mayoral
Houston
2001
Non-partisan elections
November 2001 events in the United States